TI Extended BASIC, for the TI-99/4A home computer
 Data General Extended BASIC (also known as Nova Extended BASIC), for the Data General Nova series minicomputers